A capability is the ability to execute a specified course of action or to achieve certain outcomes.

As it applies to human capital, capability represents performing or achieving certain actions/outcomes in terms of the intersection of capacity and ability.

Capability may also refer to:

Engineering
 Capability (systems engineering), the ability to execute a specified course of action
 Capability management, integrative management function in the defense sector

Computing
 Capability-based addressing, scheme used by some computers to control access to memory
 Capability-based security, concept in the design of secure computing systems

Economics
 Capability Maturity Model, a development model
 Capability Maturity Model Integration, a process improvement training and appraisal program
 Dynamic capabilities, theory in organizational sciences
 Capability management in business, capacity, materials, and expertise an organization needs in order to perform core functions
 Capability approach, theory in welfare economics

People
 Capability Brown (1716–1783), English landscape artist
 Capability Development Group

Music
 "Incapable" (Julie Bergan song)
 "Incapable" (Róisín Murphy song)

Other uses 
 USS Capable, a vessel
 Capable group, a mathematical group

See also
Ability (disambiguation)
Capacity (disambiguation)
Incapacitation (disambiguation)